Stuart Charno (born September 29, 1956) is an American actor. He has been a stand-up comic and has starred in film and on television. His first role was in the 1981 horror film Friday the 13th Part 2. Other notable appearances of his include the 1985 comedy film Just One of the Guys (as Harold "Reptile" Sherpico) and the 1986 film Modern Girls, in which he appeared with Just One of the Guys co-star Clayton Rohner. Charno has made guest appearances on various television shows including M*A*S*H, The X-Files, Chicago Hope, Team Knight Rider, and Profiler. He also received story credits on three episodes of Star Trek: The Next Generation ("The Wounded", "New Ground" and "Ethics").

Charno is the uncle of current Ice Nine Kills lead guitarist Dan Sugarman.

Filmography

Film

Television

External links 

1956 births
Living people
American male film actors
American stand-up comedians
American male television actors
Male actors from New York City
People from Queens, New York
Comedians from New York City